Auch is a commune in southwestern France. Located in the region of Occitanie, it is the capital of the Gers department. Auch is the historical capital of Gascony.

Geography

Localization

Hydrography 
The River Gers flows through the town.

Transportation 
Auch is well connected to nearby cities and towns such as Agen, Toulouse and Tarbes by Routes Nationales and by train to Toulouse.

Climate

History and population

At that time, it was settled by an Aquitanian tribe known to the Romans as the Ausci. Their name for the town was Climberrum or Elimberris. This has been tentatively etymologized from the Iberian iltir ("town, oppidum") and a cognate of the Basque berri ("new"), although another Iberian settlement in Granada recorded by the Romans as "Iliberi" probably had no contact with proto-Basque speaking peoples. The Romans renamed the town Augusta Auscorum or Ausciorum ("Augusta of the Ausci"). Augusta Auscorum was one of the twelve civitates of the province of Novempopulana (Gascony) and became the provincial capital after the 409 destruction of Eauze by the Vandals.

The common term Augusta was eventually dropped and the name evolved into the modern Gascon Aush and French Auch.

The town became the seat of a Catholic archdiocese which lasted until the French Revolution. Its archbishops claimed the title of Primate of Aquitaine, Novempopulana, and Navarre.

Sites of interest
Renaissance Cathédrale Sainte-Marie with its magnificent organ, carved stalls and rose stained-glass windows
La Tour d'Armagnac, a 14th-century prison, as well as a statue of d'Artagnan who was based on the real life person, Charles de Batz, Comte d'Artagnan born nearby in the château de Castelmore, and written about by Alexandre Dumas.
 , formerly known as the Musée des Jacobins
 
Escalier monumental Built in the 19th century

Notable people 
Auch was the birthplace of:
 Jacques Fouroux (1947–2005), rugby union player
 Louis Thomas Villaret de Joyeuse (1750–1812), admiral
 Dominic Serres (1719–1793), painter
 Reginald Garrigou-Lagrange (1877–1964), Dominican and prominent Neo-Thomist theologian
 Nicolas Portal (1979-2020), Professional cyclist for AG2R Prévoyance and Director Sportif of World Tour cycling team Ineos (ne Sky)
 Patrick Pilet (born 1981), racing driver

See also
 Gascony Show – English language radio in Auch
 Communes of the Gers department

References

External links

 Official website (in French)
 Unofficial website about Auch (in French)

Communes of Gers
Prefectures in France
Auscii
Gallia Aquitania
Armagnac